Hatcher is an unincorporated community in Quitman County, in the U.S. state of Georgia.

History
The community was named after one John H. Hatcher. Variant names were "Hatchers", "Hatcher Station", and "Hatchers Station". A post office called Hatcher's Station was established in 1866, the name was changed to Hatcher in 1929, and the post office closed in 1963.

References

Unincorporated communities in Quitman County, Georgia